Huevos rancheros ('ranch-style eggs') is a breakfast egg dish served in the style of the traditional large mid-morning fare on rural Mexican farms.

Basic dish
The basic dish consists of fried eggs served on lightly fried or charred corn or flour tortillas topped with a pico de gallo made of tomatoes, chili peppers, onion, and cilantro. Common accompaniments include refried beans, Mexican-style rice, and guacamole or slices of avocado, with cilantro as a garnish.

Variants
As the dish spread beyond Mexico, variations using wheat flour tortillas instead of corn, and pureed chili or enchilada sauce instead of tomato-chili pico de gallo, have appeared. Non-Mexican additions such as cheese, sour cream, and lettuce also have become common additions beyond the dish's native range.

Huevos divorciados (divorced eggs) are simply two eggs served in the same style as huevos rancheros but with a different sauce for each egg – usually a salsa roja and a salsa verde.

Similar dishes are huevos motuleños of Yucatan  and New Mexican enchiladas montadas.

Another variation, huevos ahogados or drowned eggs, is a traditional Mexican breakfast of eggs poached in a tomato-chile salsa.

See also
 Huevos motuleños
 List of egg dishes
 List of Mexican dishes
 Menemen
 Shakshouka

Notes

References
Leonard, Jonathan Norton, (1968) Latin-American Cooking, Time-Life Books
Ortiz, Elizabeth Lambert, (1967) The Complete Book of Mexican Cooking, M. Evans and Co. 
Paddleford, Clementine, (1960) How America Eats, Charles Scribner's Sons

External links 

Huevos Ahogados-Hispanic Kitchen
 

Cuisine of the Southwestern United States
Egg dishes
Mexican cuisine
New Mexican cuisine
Tortilla-based dishes